Kate Egan (born 10 May 1976) is an Irish journalist and newsreader working for Raidió Teilifís Éireann. She is a newsreader mainly presenting the weekend bulletins of the One O'Clock News, Six One News and Nine O'Clock News.

References

1976 births
Living people
Irish women radio presenters
Irish women journalists
RTÉ newsreaders and journalists